Harry Ramoutar (4 November 1944 – 5 May 1980) was a Trinidadian cricketer. He played in 27 first-class matches for Trinidad and Tobago from 1960 to 1977.

See also
 List of Trinidadian representative cricketers

References

External links
 

1944 births
1980 deaths
Trinidad and Tobago cricketers